Boris Dmitriyevich Tsygankov (born 17 April 1998) is a Russian football player. He plays for Novosibirsk.

Club career
He made his debut in the Russian Football National League for FC Spartak-2 Moscow on 8 July 2017 in a game against FC Sibir Novosibirsk.

International
He played for the Russia national under-17 football team in the 2015 UEFA European Under-17 Championship and 2015 FIFA U-17 World Cup.

References

External links
 Profile by Russian Football National League
 

1998 births
Living people
Footballers from Moscow
Russian footballers
Association football midfielders
Russia youth international footballers
FC Spartak Moscow players
FC Spartak-2 Moscow players
FC Torpedo Minsk players
FC Saturn Ramenskoye players
Russian First League players
Belarusian Premier League players
Russian Second League players
Russian expatriate footballers
Expatriate footballers in Belarus
Russian expatriate sportspeople in Belarus